Mount Abbott is a mountain  high, which stands  northeast of Cape Canwe and is the highest point in the Northern Foothills, in Victoria Land, Antarctica. It overlooks Terra Nova Bay. It was mapped by the Northern Party of the British Antarctic Expedition, 1910–1913, and named after Petty Officer George P. Abbott, Royal Navy, a member of the expedition.

The mountain is a basanitic cinder cone of the Melbourne Volcanic Province of the McMurdo Volcanic Group. It has been dated to 0.628 ± 0.015 million years old.

See also
List of mountains in Antarctica
List of volcanoes in Antarctica

References

Volcanoes of Victoria Land
Scott Coast
Cinder cones
Pleistocene volcanoes